Kuonoto Stadium, also known as Mini Kuonoto, also is a stadium in Buol, Buol Regency, Central Sulawesi, Indonesia.
 It has a seating capacity of 5,000 is home to Persbul Buol football club.

See also
 List of stadiums in Indonesia
 List of stadiums by capacity

References

Football venues in Indonesia
Sports venues in Indonesia
Buildings and structures in Central Sulawesi
Post-independence architecture of Indonesia
Sport in Central Sulawesi